Johnnathan Tafra Quitral (born August 8, 1983) is a Chilean sprint canoer who competed in the mid-2000s. He was eliminated in the semifinals of the C-1 1000 m event at the 2004 Summer Olympics in Athens.

External links
 
 

1983 births
Canoeists at the 2004 Summer Olympics
Canoeists at the 2011 Pan American Games
Chilean male canoeists
Chilean people of Croatian descent
Living people
Olympic canoeists of Chile
Pan American Games silver medalists for Chile
Pan American Games bronze medalists for Chile
Pan American Games medalists in canoeing
Canoeists at the 2015 Pan American Games
Medalists at the 2011 Pan American Games